Przymorze Małe (formerly ) is one of the quarters of the city of Gdańsk, Poland.

inhabitants: 18,017
area: 2.3
population density 7,786

Mainly family housing and small industry. Also a place for many exhibitions. SKM (fast city train) stop called Gdańsk Przymorze-Uniwersytet.

External links
 Map of Przymorze Małe

Gdańsk